Elections were held in Mimaropa for seats in the House of Representatives of the Philippines on May 10, 2010.

In each district, the candidate with the greatest number of votes was elected to represent that district's seat in the 15th Congress of the Philippines.

Summary

Marinduque

Incumbent Carmencita Reyes switched to the Liberal Party from Lakas-Kampi-CMD and is running for the provincial governorship; her son Edmundo is her party's nominee for the district's seat.

The result of the election is under protest in the House of Representatives Electoral Tribunal (HRET). The HRET dismissed Reyes' petition, and even padded Velasco's winning margin by an additional 39 votes. The tribunal resolved that there were no election irregularities.

Occidental Mindoro

Ma. Amelita Villarosa is the incumbent.

Oriental Mindoro

1st District
Rodolfo Valencia is the incumbent.

2nd District
Incumbent Alfonso Umali is in his third consecutive term already and is ineligible for reelection. His brother Reynaldo Umali is his party's nominee for the district's seat.

Alfonso Cusi (Sandugo), the general manager of the Manila International Airport Authority, announced on March 3, 2010 that he withdraws his candidacy for the second congressional district of Mindoro Oriental.

Palawan

1st District
Antonio Alvarez is the incumbent.

2nd District
Incumbent Abraham Khalil Mitra is in his third consecutive term already and is ineligible for reelection. He is running for the provincial governorship under the Liberal Party. His party didn't nominate anyone for this district. Outgoing governor Joel Reyes is running for the district under the Lakas Kampi CMD.

The result of the election is under protest in the House of Representatives Electoral Tribunal. But Reyes had become a fugitive due to alleged killing of journalist and environmentalist Gerardo "Gerry" Ortega.

Romblon

Eleandro Jesus Madrona is the incumbent.

References

External links
Official website of the Commission on Elections

2010 Philippine general election
2010